Damir Zobenica (born 15 April 1981) is a politician in Serbia. He has served in the Assembly of Vojvodina since 2012 and has been a vice-president (i.e., deputy chair) of the assembly since 2016. Zobenica is a member of the Serbian Progressive Party.

Early life and career
Zobenica was born in Pula, in what was then the Socialist Republic of Croatia in the Socialist Federal Republic of Yugoslavia. He completed grammar school in Novi Sad and graduated from the University of Novi Sad Faculty of Philosophy in 2008 with a sociology degree.

Politician
Zobenica joined the Progressive Party upon its founding in 2008. The following year, he was chosen as president of the local community office in Sremska Kamenica. 

He received the seventh position on the Progressive Party's electoral list for the Novi Sad municipal assembly in the 2012 Serbian local elections and was elected when the list won fifteen mandates. The Democratic Party and its allies initially formed a coalition government at the municipal level in Novi Sad, and Zobenica served as a member of the opposition. The Progressives and their allies formed a new administration in October 2012 following a shift in local alliances, and he served as advisor to the mayor between 2012 and 2016.

Member of the provincial assembly
Zobenica was elected to his first term in the Vojvodina assembly in the 2012 provincial election, winning Novi Sad's first constituency seat. The election was won by the Democratic Party and its allies, and the Progressives served in opposition for the next four years.

Vojvodina switched to a system of full proportional representation for the 2016 provincial election, and Zobenica was given the third position on the Progressive Party's list. This was tantamount to election, and he was indeed re-elected when the list won a majority victory with sixty-three out of 120 mandates. He was chosen as a vice-president of the assembly following the election and held this role for the next four years. 

Zobenica also became active with the Assembly of European Regions during this time, serving as vice-president of Committee 1 (dealing with economic and regional economic cooperation issues) in 2016–17. He subsequently became vice-president of the assembly in charge of diplomacy and Black Sea cooperation in 2017–19 and vice-president in charge of regional economic development beginning in 2019.

He was given the second position on the Progressive Party's list in the 2020 provincial election and was elected to a third term when the list won an increased majority with seventy-six seats. He was confirmed for another term as vice-president of the assembly after the election, and he serves as a member of the committee on European integration and interregional cooperation and the committee on administrative and mandatory issues. He has also continued to participate in Serbia's delegation to the Assembly of European Regions.

Electoral Record

Provincial (Vojvodina)

References

1981 births
Living people
People from Pula
Politicians from Novi Sad
Members of the Assembly of Vojvodina
Members of the Assembly of European Regions
Serbian Progressive Party politicians